The office of Butler of Scotland,  was a court position in the Kingdom of Scotland during the High Middle Ages.

Office holders
 Ranulf I de Soules
 William II de Haya
 Nicholas I de Soules
 William I de Soules
 Nicholas II de Soules
 William II de Soules

References

Notes

Sources
Balfour Paul, Sir James, Scots Peerage IX vols. Edinburgh 1905.

Great Officers of State of Scotland
Political office-holders in Scotland
Lists of office-holders in Scotland
Positions within the British Royal Household
Scotland in the High Middle Ages